The Gadsden Correctional Facility  is a private state prison for women located in Quincy, Gadsden County, Florida, operated by Management and Training Corporation (MTC) under contract with the Florida Department of Corrections.  This facility was opened in 1995 and has a maximum capacity of 1544 prisoners.

, the prison houses 1,530 prisoners.

In the mid-2010s C-Dorm had issues with its plumbing and no heat. This meant water for prisoners was rationed and there was no hot water. After three inspections occurred, David Richardson, a Florida congressperson, asked MTC to install a new water heater for the facility. It was installed in February 2017 shortly before the fourth inspection.

References

Prisons in Florida
Buildings and structures in Gadsden County, Florida
Management and Training Corporation
1995 establishments in Florida